Thomas Glynfor "Glyn" Hughes (29 November 1931 – 19 August 1995) was a Welsh professional footballer, who played as a winger. He made appearances in the English football league in the 1950s for Welsh clubs Wrexham and Newport County.

References

1931 births
1995 deaths
Welsh footballers
Association football wingers
Llay Welfare F.C. players
Sheffield Wednesday F.C. players
Wrexham A.F.C. players
Newport County A.F.C. players
Caernarfon Town F.C. players
English Football League players
Sportspeople from Wrexham County Borough